Center Township may refer to the following places in the U.S. state of Indiana:

 Center Township, Benton County, Indiana
 Center Township, Boone County, Indiana
 Center Township, Clinton County, Indiana
 Center Township, Dearborn County, Indiana
 Center Township, Delaware County, Indiana
 Center Township, Gibson County, Indiana
 Center Township, Grant County, Indiana
 Center Township, Greene County, Indiana
 Center Township, Hancock County, Indiana
 Center Township, Hendricks County, Indiana
 Center Township, Howard County, Indiana
 Center Township, Jennings County, Indiana
 Center Township, LaPorte County, Indiana
 Center Township, Lake County, Indiana
 Center Township, Marion County, Indiana
 Center Township, Marshall County, Indiana
 Center Township, Martin County, Indiana
 Center Township, Porter County, Indiana
 Center Township, Posey County, Indiana
 Center Township, Ripley County, Indiana
 Center Township, Rush County, Indiana
 Center Township, Starke County, Indiana
 Center Township, Union County, Indiana
 Center Township, Vanderburgh County, Indiana
 Center Township, Wayne County, Indiana

See also
Center Township (disambiguation)

Indiana township disambiguation pages